Zuwetina ( Marsa Uasili) is a coastal town and oil-exporting port in the Al Wahat District of the Cyrenaica region in north-eastern Libya.  From 1987 to 2007 Zuwetina was in the former Ajdabiya District.  The oil terminal in the small harbor is operated by the Zuwetina Oil Company. The town's primary activities relate to oil production and transshipping crude oil. It is about 180 km south west of Benghazi. The port was the site of skirmishes between pro- and anti-Gaddafi forces during the 2011 Libyan civil war.

Notes

External links
"Zuwetina Map — Satellite Images of Zuwetina" Maplandia World Gazetteer 

Port cities and towns in Libya
Populated places in Al Wahat District
Cyrenaica
Ports and harbors of Libya